Area code 229 is a telephone area code in the North American Numbering Plan for the southwest corner of the U.S. state of Georgia. The numbering plan area includes the cities of Albany, Valdosta, Leesburg, Bainbridge, Americus, Vienna, Fitzgerald, Ocilla, Cairo, Moultrie, Thomasville, McRae-Helena, and Tifton.

The area code was created in 2001 in a three-way split of area code 912, which had served the southern half of Georgia for forty-six years. Savannah and the eastern portion retained area code 912, while Macon and the northern portion were assigned to area code 478.

Based upon projections from October 2021, the area code is not expected to need relief until 2029.

Service area
Area code 229 serves the following Georgia counties:

 Baker
 Ben Hill
 Berrien
 Brooks
 Calhoun
 Clay
 Colquitt
 Cook
 Crisp
 Decatur
 Dodge (part with area code 478)
 Dooly County, Georgia (part with area code 478)
 Dougherty
 Early
 Echols (part with area code 912)
 Grady
 Irwin
 Lanier
 Lee
 Lowndes
 Marion
 Miller
 Mitchell
 Pulaski (part with area code 478)
 Quitman
 Randolph
 Schley
 Seminole
 Stewart
 Sumter
 Telfair (part with area code 912)
 Terrell
 Thomas
 Tift
 Turner
 Webster
 Wilcox
 Worth

References

External links

List of exchanges from CIDLookup.com, 229 Area Code

229
229
Telecommunications-related introductions in 2001